Yolanda of Hungary may refer to:
 Jolenta of Poland (1235-1298), Duchess-Consort of Greater Poland, saint
 Violant of Hungary (1216-1253), Queen of Aragon